Cicindela allardi is a species of Carabidae, or ground beetle, in the genus Cicindela.

References

allardi
Beetles described in 1983